Local elections were held in Serbia on 11 May 2008, concurrently with the 2008 Serbian parliamentary election and the 2008 Vojvodina provincial election. A re-vote was held at three poling stations in Belgrade on 18 May 2008 due to irregularities in the voting process.

Background
According to the Constitutional Law adopted by the National Assembly on 30 September 2006 that proclaimed the new constitution, the parliamentary Speaker (at that time Oliver Dulić from DS) had to schedule the elections for local administrative units by 31 December 2007. He scheduled them on 2007-12-29. Following the official breakdown of the government on 8 March 2008, early parliamentary elections were held on the same date.

Negotiations between the ruling parties, the President's DS and the Premier's DSS, were trying to enact a compromise on the date of the election. Tadić's Democratic Party wanted to respect the constitutional law, wanting to schedule the election by the end of year and hold it in March 2008, which is DSS's demand because of the solution of the status of Kosovo. G17 Plus wanted the Mayors and municipal Presidents to be elected directly as in the past, but the Democratic Party wanted them to be elected by the local parliaments.

Four laws necessary for the local elections (on territorial organisation, the capital, local elections and local self-government) were passed before the elections.

There were some notable changes from the previous local electoral cycle in 2004:
the direct election of mayors was eliminated, and mayors were instead chosen by elected members of the assemblies;
the electoral threshold was increased from three to five per cent (of all votes, not only of valid votes);
all assembly mandates were awarded to candidates on successful lists at the discretion of the sponsoring candidates, irrespective of numerical order.

In areas geographically comprising Sandžak, the Sandžak Democratic Party and Democratic Party ran in local elections together. The European Coalition of DS, G17+ and SPO ran in all Municipalities and Cities, except in Niš, where G17+ had been part of ruling coalition for the last years and where DS was running against them. The "Serb List" political of SRS, DSS, NS, SPS and several nationalist civic groups and organizations had been formed and ran in most of Vojvodina locally.

My Serbia of Branislav Lečić ran individually in local elections. Mayor of Novi Sad and former Radical Maja Gojković ran in the City with her civic group "For Our Novi Sad".

Kosovo

According to UNMIK practice, Serbian national referendums and elections for Parliament and President were allowed in Kosovo, but local elections are organized separately by UNMIK and the PISG. Despite all of this Serbia accomplished the local elections in Kosovo 2008 that were not recognized by UNMIK.

Repeat elections
The municipalities of Knjaževac, Prijepolje, Ruma, and Vrnjačka Banja were not able to form governments after the election. Repeat elections were held in these municipalities on 10 November 2008.

Results

Belgrade

City of Belgrade
Results of the election for the City Assembly of Belgrade:

The City of Belgrade election, like the concurrent national assembly election, did not initially produce a clear winner. Representatives of the Radical Party, the Democratic Party of Serbia–New Serbia alliance, and the alliance around the Socialist Party held discussions about forming government; had these parties finalized an agreement, Aleksandar Vučić of the Radical Party would have become mayor.

Ultimately, however, For a European Serbia formed a coalition government with the alliance around the Socialist Party. The Liberal Democratic Party was not a part of the coalition but offered outside support. Dragan Đilas of the Democratic Party became mayor and Milan Krkobabić of the Party of United Pensioners of Serbia (aligned with the Socialist Party) became deputy mayor.

Branislav Belić served as mayor on an interim basis from July to August 2008, before Đilas was sworn in.

Municipalities of Belgrade
Elections were held in all seventeen of Belgrade's constituent municipalities in 2008. The elections were generally a victory for the For a European Serbia alliance led by the Democratic Party, which ultimately won the mayor's office in twelve municipalities. The Democratic Party of Serbia did not finish in first place in any municipalities, but party representatives became mayors in three municipalities: Grocka and Mladenovac in alliance with the Democratic Party, and Lazarevac in alliance with the Radical Party. The Radicals held the mayoralty in their historical stronghold of Zemun, and former Socialist Živorad Milosavljević's independent list retained power in Sopot.

This was the last time the Radical Party was the dominant party in any municipal government in Belgrade. The party split later in the year, and the breakaway Serbian Progressive Party ultimately superseded the Radicals in popular support.

Many of the governing coalitions formed after the election were unstable, and new elections were held in the municipalities of Voždovac and Zemun in 2009.

Barajevo
Results of the election for the Municipal Assembly of Barajevo:

Branka Savić of the Democratic Party was chosen as mayor after the election. The local government was formed by the Democratic Party, the Democratic Party of Serbia, New Serbia, and the Socialist Party.

Čukarica
Results of the election for the Municipal Assembly of Čukarica:

Milan Tlačinac of the Democratic Party was chosen as mayor after the election. The municipal government was formed by the Democratic Party and G17 Plus (both from the For a European Serbia alliance) and the Liberal Democratic Party.

Grocka
Results of the election for the Municipal Assembly of Grocka:

The election did not produce a clear winner. Zoran Jovanović of the Democratic Party of Serbia was chosen as mayor after the election; the Democratic Party of Serbia, Democratic Party, Socialist Party, and Strength of the Citizens formed the municipal government. After a shift in the municipality's political alliances, Milan Janković of the Socialist Party became mayor on 22 June 2010.

Lazarevac
Results of the election for the Municipal Assembly of Lazarevac:

The election did not produce a clear winner. Incumbent mayor Branko Borić of the Democratic Party of Serbia was confirmed for another term in office following the election. The local government was formed by the Democratic Party of Serbia, the Radicals, New Serbia, and the Socialist Party of Serbia–Party of United Pensioners of Serbia alliance.

Mladenovac
Results of the election for the Municipal Assembly of Mladenovac:

The election did not produce a clear winner. Branislav Jovanović of the Democratic Party of Serbia was chosen as mayor, by a vote of twenty-nine to twenty-six. The municipal government was formed by For a European Serbia, the Democratic Party of Serbia–New Serbia alliance, and Alliance for the Revival of Mladenovac.

New Belgrade
Results of the election for the Municipal Assembly of New Belgrade:

Nenad Milenković of the Democratic Party was chosen as mayor after the election.

Obrenovac
Results of the election for the Municipal Assembly of Obrenovac:

Željko Jovetić of the Democratic Party was chosen as mayor after the election.

Palilula
Results of the election for the Municipal Assembly of Palilula:

Incumbent mayor Danilo Bašić of the Democratic Party was confirmed for another term in office after the election, receiving thirty out of fifty-five votes. The municipal government was formed by For a European Serbia, the Liberal Democratic Party, and the alliance around the Socialist Party.

Rakovica
Results of the election for the Municipal Assembly of Rakovica:

Incumbent mayor Bojan Milić of the Democratic Party was confirmed for a new term in office after the election. The governing majority consisted of For a European Serbia, the alliance around the Socialist Party, and the Liberal Democratic Party.

Zoran Krasić was the lead candidate on the Radical Party's list, although he did not take a seek in the assembly afterwards.

Savski Venac
Results of the election for the Municipal Assembly of Savski Venac:

Incumbent mayor Tomislav Đorđević of the Democratic Party was confirmed for another term in office after the election. The government was formed by the Democratic Party and G17 Plus (both from the For a European Serbia alliance) and the Liberal Democratic Party. Parliamentarians Nataša Vučković and Nenad Konstantinović were elected as Democratic Party candidates.

Sopot
Results of the election for the Municipal Assembly of Sopot:

Incumbent mayor Živorad Milosavljević of the For the Municipality of Sopot list was confirmed for another term in office after the election.

Stari Grad
Results of the election for the Municipal Assembly of Stari Grad:

Incumbent mayor Mirjana Božidarević of the Democratic Party was confirmed for another term in office after the election. Nemanja Šarović received the lead position on the Radical Party's list, although he did not take a mandate when the assembly convened.

Surčin
Results of the election for the Municipal Assembly of Surčin:

The election did not produce a clear winner. Incumbent mayor Vojislav Janošević of the Democratic Party was ultimately confirmed for another term in office after the election.

Voždovac
Results of the election for the Municipal Assembly of Voždovac:

Incumbent mayor Goran Lukačević of the Democratic Party was confirmed for another term in office after the election, with the support of twenty-nine delegates. He was supported by the For a European Serbia coalition, the Liberal Democratic Party, and the Socialist–United Pensioners alliance. Parliamentarian Marina Raguš led the Radical Party's list, though she did not take a seat in the municipal assembly afterwards.

Lukačević announced his resignation as mayor in January 2009, and the president of the assembly resigned at the same time. A new municipal election was held in June 2009.

Vračar
Results of the election for the Municipal Assembly of Vračar:

Vračar was the only municipality in Belgrade where the For a European Serbia list won an outright majority. Incumbent mayor Branimir Kuzmanović of the Democratic Party was confirmed afterward for a new term in office.

Zemun
Results of the election for the Municipal Assembly of Zemun:

Slavko Jerković of the Radical Party was chosen as mayor after the election.

Zvezdara
Results of the election for the Municipal Assembly of Zvezdara:

Incumbent mayor Milan Popović of the Democratic Party was confirmed for another term in office after the election. Future parliamentarian Marija Leković, at the time a member of the Democratic Party, was appointed to the municipal council (i.e., the executive branch of the municipal government) on 18 March 2009.

Vojvodina

Central Banat District

Zrenjanin
Results of the election for the City Assembly of Zrenjanin:

Incumbent mayor Goran Knežević, at the time a member of the Democratic Party, was confirmed for another term in office after the election, leading a coalition that included the League of Social Democrats, the Hungarian Coalition, and the Equality group. Knežević was arrested on corruption charges on 1 October 2008 and dismissed as mayor on 23 April 2009. He was replaced by Mileta Mihajlov, also of the Democratic Party.

Elvira Kovács led the Hungarian Coalition list, although she did not take a mandate afterwards.

Nova Crnja
Results of the election for the Municipal Assembly of Nova Crnja:

Pera Milankov was chosen as mayor after the election, leading a coalition government that included the For a European Vojvodina group. A member of the Democratic Party of Serbia (DSS) during the election, he subsequently joined the Democratic Party (DS).

Novi Bečej
Results of the election for the Municipal Assembly of Novi Bečej:

Incumbent mayor Milivoj "Misa" Vrebalov of the Liberal Democratic Party was chosen for another term in office after the election. The Liberal Democrats formed a coalition government with the For a European Novi Bečej group.

Sečanj
Results of the election for the Municipal Assembly of Sečanj:

Incumbent mayor Predrag Milošević, the leader of the independent For the Development of the Municipality of Sečanj list, was confirmed for a new term in office with the support of the For a European Vojvodina group.

Žitište
Results of the election for the Municipal Assembly of Žitište:

Dragan Milenković of the Democratic Party was chosen as mayor after the election.

North Bačka District
Elections were held in all three municipalities in the North Bačka District. The For a European Serbia coalition won a plurality victory in Subotica and governed in a sometimes difficult coalition with the Hungarian Coalition, which won a majority victory in Bačka Topola and a strong plurality victory in Mali Iđoš.

Subotica
Results of the election for the Municipal Assembly of Subotica:

Saša Vučinić of the Democratic Party was chosen as mayor after the election. The Hungarian Coalition participated in the city's coalition government. Relations between the governing parties were often difficult.

Bačka Topola
Results of the election for the Municipal Assembly of Bačka Topola:

Incumbent mayor Atila Babi of the Hungarian Coalition was confirmed for another term in office after the election. Árpád Fremond appeared on the Hungarian Coalition list but was not given a local mandate.

Mali Iđoš
Results of the election for the Municipal Assembly of Mali Iđoš:

Róbert Csóré of the Hungarian Coalition was chosen as mayor after the election.

North Banat District
Elections were held in all six municipalities of the North Banat District. The Radicals won a narrow victory in Kikinda, although they fell from power later in the year and were replaced by the Democratic Party. The Democrats also won in Ada, Čoka, and Novi Kneževac, while the Hungarian Coalition won in Kanjiža and Senta.

Kikinda
Results of the election for the Municipal Assembly of Kikinda:

Incumbent mayor Branislav Blažić of the Radical Party was initially confirmed for another term in office after the election, leading a coalition that also included the Socialist Party and the Democratic Party of Serbia. While still in office, Blažić left the Radicals to join the newly formed Serbian Progressive Party, taking most of the local Radical Party organization with him. After doing this, he sent the offer of a coalition government to the Democratic Party, which was rejected. On 20 October 2008, the Democratic Party formed a new administration that included the Socialists, the Alliance of Vojvodina Hungarians, the League of Social Democrats, and the Serbian Renewal Movement; Jagoda Tolicki served as mayor. Tolicki was in turn replaced by fellow Democratic Party member Ilija Vojinović on 17 June 2009.

Ada
Results of the election for the Municipal Assembly of Ada:

Zoltán Bilicki of the Democratic Party was chosen as mayor after the election.

Čoka
Results of the election for the Municipal Assembly of Čoka:

Incumbent mayor Predrag Mijić of the Democratic Party was confirmed for another term in office after the election. He resigned in 2011, after a ruling that he could not continue to hold a dual mandate as mayor and a member of the Assembly of Vojvodina. He was replaced by Emil Poljak, also a member of the Democratic Party. The Hungarian Coalition participated in the local government.

Kanjiža
Results of the election for the Municipal Assembly of Kanjiža:

Mihály Nyilas of the Alliance of Vojvodina Hungarians was chosen as mayor after the election.

Novi Kneževac
Results of the election for the Municipal Assembly of Novi Kneževac:

Dragan Babić of the Democratic Party served as mayor after the election.

Senta
Results of the election for the Municipal Assembly of Senta:

Zoltán Pék of the Alliance of Vojvodina Hungarians was chosen as mayor after the election. He remained in this role until February 2010, when shifting political alliances allowed the Democratic Party to form a new administration with Anikó Širková as mayor.

South Bačka District
Local elections were held in the one city (Novi Sad) and all eleven separate municipalities in the South Bačka District.

The City of Novi Sad comprises two municipalities (the City municipality of Novi Sad and Petrovaradin), although their powers are very limited relative to the city government. Unlike Belgrade, Niš, and Vranje, Novi Sad does not have directly elected municipal assemblies.

The Radical Party finished in first place in six municipalities, although the party's hold on power in these areas was not strong. The Radicals initially formed government in four of the six municipalities where they won the popular vote, but they soon lost power in all four, weakened by internal divisions and by the loss of the Socialist Party as a coalition partner. (The Radicals returned to power in Bačka Palanka in 2010 and remained in office there until 2012. They have not led a local government in the district since that time.)

By the end of 2008, members of the Democratic Party held the mayoralties in Novi Sad and eight other jurisdictions. Representatives of different parties in the Hungarian Coalition claimed the mayoralties in Bečej and Temerin, and an independent list broadly aligned with the Democratic Party won the election in Srbobran.

Novi Sad
Results of the election for the City Assembly of Novi Sad:

Igor Pavličić of the Democratic Party was chosen as mayor after the election, with the support of forty-one delegates. The Hungarian Coalition and the Socialist Party participated in the governing coalition (with the latter party serving on the city's executive, even though it did not win any seats in the assembly).

Former mayor Milorad Mirčić appeared in the second position on the Radical list, although he did not take a mandate afterward. Future parliamentarian Nada Lazić, a member of the League of Social Democrats of Vojvodina, appeared in the thirty-fifth position on the Together for Vojvodina list and also did not receive a mandate.

Bač
Results of the election for the Municipal Assembly of Bač:

Incumbent mayor Tomislav Bogunović of the Democratic Party was confirmed for another term in office after the election.

Bačka Palanka
Results of the election for the Municipal Assembly of Bačka Palanka:

Incumbent mayor Dragan Bozalo of the Radical Party was confirmed for another term in office on 3 June 2008, following a coalition agreement between the Radicals, the Socialists, and the Democratic Party of Serbia (DSS). The Democratic Party (DS) subsequently formed a new multi-party coalition including the Socialist Party and the DSS, and on 3 November 2008 DS member Kosta Stakić became mayor. In April 2010, the Radicals formed a new coalition with the DSS (following the defection of a For a European Serbia delegate), and Bozalo returned to office again.

Bački Petrovac
Results of the election for the Municipal Assembly of Bački Petrovac:

Ondrej Benka of the Democratic Party was initially chosen as mayor after the election. He resigned in October 2008 and was replaced by Vladimir Turan of the same party.

Bečej
Results of the election for the Municipal Assembly of Bečej:

Peter Knezi of the Alliance of Vojvodina Hungarians was chosen as mayor after the election.

Beočin
Results of the election for the Municipal Assembly of Beočin:

Incumbent mayor Zoran Tešić of the Radical Party was initially confirmed for a new term in office in June 2008, with an assembly majority that also included the Socialists, the Democratic Party of Serbia, the Party of United Pensioners of Serbia, the Goran Kalabić list, and the New Democratic Party of Roma in Serbia. Two months later, a realignment of political forces in the community led to Bogdan Cvejić of the Democratic Party replacing Tešić as mayor. Cvejić's administration was supported by G17 Plus, the League of Social Democrats, the Socialist Party of Serbia, and the Party of United Pensioners of Serbia.

Srbobran
Results of the election for the Municipal Assembly of Srbobran:

Incumbent mayor Branko Gajin was confirmed for another term in office after the election. The municipal government was formed by Gajin's list, the Hungarian Coalition, and the Democratic Party.

Sremski Karlovci
Results of the election for the Municipal Assembly of Sremski Karlovci:

Incumbent mayor Milenko Filipović of G17 Plus (a part of the For a European Serbia alliance) was confirmed for another term in office after the election. He later joined the Democratic Party.

Temerin
Results of the election for the Municipal Assembly of Temerin:

Gustonj Andraš of the Democratic Party of Vojvodina Hungarians (a part of the Hungarian Coalition) was chosen as mayor after the election.

Titel
Results of the election for the Municipal Assembly of Titel:

Incumbent mayor Milivoj Petrović of the Democratic Party was confirmed for another term in office after the election. The local administration was supported by the Democratic Party, the Socialist Party, and the two independent assembly members.

Vrbas
Results of the election for the Municipal Assembly of Vrbas:

Incumbent mayor Željko Lainović of the Radical Party was confirmed for another term in office after the election. The assembly majority consisted of the Radicals, the Socialists, and the Democratic Party of Serbia. The Socialists subsequently withdrew their support from the government, leading to new elections in 2009.

Žabalj
Results of the election for the Municipal Assembly of Žabalj:

Dragiša Đorđević of the Radical Party was chosen as mayor after the election, in a coalition with the alliances around the Socialist Party and the Democratic Party of Serbia. In November 2008, both of these groups left the Radicals and formed a new coalition led by the Democratic Party, with Branko Stajić as mayor.

West Bačka District
Local elections were held in the one city (Sombor) and all three other municipalities of the West Bačka District. The Democratic Party won and formed government in Sombor and Kula, longtime Socialist Party of Serbia mayor Živorad Smiljanić led his party to another victory in Apatin, and the Serbian Radical Party formed an unstable government in Odžaci. The last of these local governments fell the following year, and a new election was held in 2010.

Sombor
Results of the election for the City Assembly of Sombor:

Dušan Jović, at the time a member of the Democratic Party, was chosen as mayor after the election. He was replaced by Nemanja Delić of the same party in November 2009.

SPO member Žika Gojković was one of the three members elected on the Let's Get Sombor Working Together list. He was also elected to the national assembly, and he resigned his seat in the local parliament on 4 July 2008.

Zlata Đerić of New Serbia appeared in the third position on the "For the Sombor I Want!" list.

Apatin
Results of the election for the Municipal Assembly of Apatin:

Incumbent mayor Živorad Smiljanić of the Socialist Party was confirmed for another term in office after the election.

Kula
Results of the election for the Municipal Assembly of Kula:

Incumbent mayor Svetozar Bukvić on the Democratic Party was confirmed for another term in office after the election. He left office in December 2011 when the Serbian government dissolved the local administration and set up a temporary authority led by Željko Kovač, also of the Democratic Party.

Odžaci
Results of the election for the Municipal Assembly of Odžaci:

Incumbent mayor Milan Ćuk of the Radical Party was confirmed for another term in office after the election. The government proved to be unstable, and the municipal assembly became dysfunctional in 2009 after the Socialists withdrew their support from Ćuk's administration. The government of Serbia removed Ćuk as mayor in August 2009 and set up a temporary authority with Veroljub Marković of the Democratic Party as its leader. A new election was held in the municipality on 24 January 2010.

Central Serbia (excluding Belgrade)

Mačva District

Bogatić

Nišava District
Local elections were held for the City Assembly of Niš, the assemblies in all five of Niš's constituent municipalities, and the assemblies in all six of the Nišava District's other municipalities.

The results in the election for the city assembly were inconclusive. As at the republic level, and in Belgrade, a coalition was ultimately formed by the For a European Serbia alliance and the Socialist Party. Representatives of the Democratic Party also claimed the mayors offices in Meridana and Pantelej, while a member of the Socialist Party became mayor in a coalition government in Palilula. The Democratic Party of Serbia dominated the local coalition in Niška Banja, while the Radicals led the coalition government in Crveni Krst (and remained in power following the split in the party).

The Radicals also won the election in Aleksinac and were initially the dominant force in that municipality's governing coalition. After the party split, a new governing coalition came to power with a member of the Democratic Party of Serbia as mayor.

Local incumbents from New Serbia were re-elected in Doljevac and Ražanj, and an incumbent Socialist Party mayor was confirmed for another term in Gadžin Han. In Merošina, a Socialist Party representative served as mayor in a governing alliance with the Democratic Party and G17 Plus. United Peasant Party leader Milija Miletić was chosen as mayor in Svrljig and remained in office for the term that followed, excepting a three-month period in 2009–10.

Niš
Results of the election for the City Assembly of Niš:

The election did not produce a clear winner, and a coalition government was ultimately formed by the Democratic Party, G17 Plus, and the Socialist Party. Miloś Simonović of the Democratic Party served as mayor.

Crveni Krst
Results of the election for the Municipal Assembly of Crveni Krst:

Incumbent mayor Dragan Bojković of the Serbian Radical Party was confirmed for a new term in office after the election. The government also included the Democratic Party of Serbia and was supported by the Socialists and New Serbia. Bojković was succeeded by fellow Radical Party member Lelica Kostić on 13 July 2009.

Medijana
Results of the election for the Municipal Assembly of Medijana:

Incumbent mayor Dragoslav Ćirković of the Democratic Party was confirmed for a new term in office after the election.

Niška Banja
Results of the election for the Municipal Assembly of Niška Banja:

Incumbent mayor Zoran Vidanović of the Democratic Party of Serbia was confirmed for another term in office after the election.

Palilula, Niš
Results of the election for the Municipal Assembly of Palilula, Niš:

Igor Novaković of the Socialist Party was chosen as mayor after the election.

Pantelej
Results of the election for the Municipal Assembly of Pantelej:

Slaviša Dinić of the Democratic Party was chosen as mayor after the election.

Aleksinac
Results of the election for the Municipal Assembly of Aleksinac:

Incumbent mayor Nenad Stanković of the Radical Party was confirmed for another term in office after the election, leading a coalition that also included the Democratic Party of Serbia, the Socialists, the Party of United Pensioners of Serbia, and the Movement for the Municipality of Aleksinac group. The Radicals split later in the year, and Stanković joined the breakaway Serbian Progressive Party, taking twelve other members of the Radical assembly group with him. In November 2008, a new governing majority was established by the Radicals, the Democratic Party of Serbia, New Serbia, the Movement for the Municipality of Aleksinac group, the Serbian Renewal Movement, and G17 Plus. Stanković resigned, and Ivan Dimić of the Democratic Party of Serbia became the new mayor in early 2009.

Doljevac
Results of the election for the Municipal Assembly of Doljevac:

Incumbent mayor Goran Ljubić of New Serbia was confirmed for another term in office after the election. In 2011, he left New Serbia and joined the United Regions of Serbia.

Gadžin Han
Results of the election for the Municipal Assembly of Gadžin Han:

Incumbent mayor Saša Đorđević of the Socialist Party was confirmed for another term in office after the election.

Merošina
Results of the election for the Municipal Assembly of Merošina:

Slobodan Todorović of the Socialist Party was chosen as mayor after the election, in a coalition government that also included the Democratic Party and G17 Plus.

Ražanj
Results of the election for the Municipal Assembly of Ražanj:

Incumbent mayor Dobrica Stojković of New Serbia was confirmed for another term in office after the election.

Svrljig
Results of the election for the Municipal Assembly of Svrljig:

Milija Miletić of the United Peasant Party was chosen as mayor after the election. He was removed from office in December 2009 and was replaced by Slavica Božinović of the Democratic Party, who governed in a coalition with G17 Plus, the Socialists, New Serbia, and the Democratic Party of Serbia. In March 2010, Miletić returned to office in an alliance with the Radical Party.

Podunavlje District
Local elections were held in the one city (Smederevo) and the two other municipalities of the Podunavlje District. The Serbian Radical Party technically won the election in Smederevo but fell well short of a majority; the Democratic Party, which finished second, was able to form a coalition government. The Democratic Party also won in Smederevska Palanka, while the Democratic Party of Serbia won in Velika Plana.

Smederevo
Results of the election for the City Assembly of Smederevo:

Predrag Umičević of the Democratic Party was chosen as mayor after the election.

Smederevska Palanka
Results of the election for the Municipal Assembly of Smederevska Palanka:

Nenad Milojičić of the Democratic Party was chosen as mayor after the election. He was succeeded by Živko Petrović of the same party in 2010.

Velika Plana
Results of the election for the Municipal Assembly of Velika Plana:

Incumbent mayor Dejan Šulkić of the Democratic Party of Serbia was confirmed for another term in office after the election.

Pomoravlje District
Local elections were held in the one city (Jagodina) and all five other municipalities of the Pomoravlje District. United Serbia won a majority victory in its home base of Jagodina in an alliance with the Socialist Party of Serbia; a member of United Serbia also claimed the mayoralty in Ćuprija as part of the Socialist Party's alliance.

The Democratic Party won in Despotovac, Paraćin, and Rekovac. In Svilajnac, a member of G17 Plus claimed the mayoralty in alliance with the Democratic Party.

Jagodina
Results of the election for the City Assembly of Jagodina:

Incumbent mayor Dragan Marković Palma, the leader of United Serbia, was confirmed for another term in office after the election.

Ćuprija
Results of the election for the Municipal Assembly of Ćuprija:

Borivoje Kalaba of United Serbia was chosen as mayor after the election.

Despotovac
Results of the election for the Municipal Assembly of Despotovac:

Mališa Alimpijević of the Democratic Party was chosen as mayor after the election.

Paraćin
Results of the election for the Municipal Assembly of Paraćin:

Incumbent mayor Saša Paunović of the Democratic Party was confirmed for another term in office after the election.

Rekovac
Results of the election for the Municipal Assembly of Rekovac:

Dragan Prodanović of the Democratic Party was chosen as mayor after the election.

Svilajnac
Results of the election for the Municipal Assembly of Svilajnac:

Gorica Dimčić Tasić of G17 Plus was chosen as mayor after the election.

Raška District
Local elections were held in the two cities (Kraljevo and Novi Pazar) and the three other municipalities of the Raška District. The Democratic Party won plurality victories in Kraljevo and Vrnjačka Banja and, following periods of political instability in both communities, was ultimately able to form relatively stable coalition governments. The Serbian Radical Party won in Raška and held power for most of the term that followed.

The Sandžak Democratic Party won in the predominantly Bosniak city of Novi Pazar, and the Party of Democratic Action of Sandžak won in the municipality of Tutin.

Kraljevo
Results of the election for the City Assembly of Kraljevo:

Incumbent mayor Miloš Babić of New Serbia was confirmed for another term in office in May 2008. He died of a heart attack on 27 February 2009. Deputy Mayor Vesna Nikolić Vukajlović of the Serbian Radical Party briefly served as the city's acting mayor until a new coalition government was formed in March 2009 by For a European Serbia, the Socialist Party of Serbia, and the Movement for Kraljevo; Ljubiša Simović of the Democratic Party became the city's new mayor.

In April 2010, shifting local alliances brought Ljubiša Jovašević of the Movement for Kraljevo to the mayor's office under controversial circumstances. Simović did not accept the new government's legitimacy, and both individuals claimed the mayoralty over the following months. This was resolved in Simović's favour by the end of July 2010, and he continued in office for the remainder of the term.

Novi Pazar
Results of the election for the City Assembly of Novi Pazar:

Mirsad Đerlek of Sandžak Democratic Party (a member of the For a European Novi Pazar alliance) was chosen as mayor after the election, leading a coalition government that also included the United Serbian List. He was replaced by Meho Mahmu­tović, also of the Sandžak Democratic Party, in September 2009.

Raška
Results of the election for the Municipal Assembly of Raška:

Radenko Cvetić of the Serbian Radical Party was chosen as mayor after the election. In December 2010, the Democratic Party and the Socialist Party of Serbia formed a new coalition with Dragiša Ilić as mayor. He remained in office for a year; in December 2011, another political realignment in the municipality brought Cvetić back to power.

Tutin
Results of the election for the City Assembly of Tutin:

Incumbent mayor Šemsudin Kučević of the Party of Democratic Action of Sandžak (the leading party in the Bosniak List for a European Sandžak coalition) was confirmed for another term in office after the election. He resigned shortly thereafter to become a deputy director in Serbia's Office for Sustainable Development of Underdeveloped Areas, and Bajro Gegić of the same party was chosen as his successor.

Vrnjačka Banja
Results of the election for the City Assembly of Vrnjačka Banja:

The municipality of Vrnjačka Banja did not constitute a government within the legal deadline, and a new election was held on 10 November 2008. Zoran Seizović of the Democratic Party was appointed as leader of a provincial authority.

The results of the repeat election were as follows:

Zoran Seizović of the Democratic Party was chosen as mayor after the election.

Šumadija District
Elections were held in the one city (Kragujevac) and all six municipalities of the Šumadija District. Incumbent mayor Veroljub Stevanović was re-elected in Kragujevac in an alliance with G17 Plus. The Democratic Party won in Batočina and Knić, candidates of New Serbia won the mayoralties in Topola and Rača, and the Serbian Renewal Movement won in Lapovo. A candidate of the Serbian Radical Party won in Aranđelovac but was removed from office the following year, and an administration led by the Democratic Party was established.

Kragujevac
Results of the election for the City Assembly of Kragujevac:

Incumbent mayor and Together for Kragujevac leader Veroljub Stevanović was confirmed for another term in office after the election.

Mirko Čikiriz of the Serbian Renewal Movement was elected on the For a European Serbia list. He resigned from the city assembly on 10 October 2008.

Aranđelovac
Results of the election for the Municipal Assembly of Aranđelovac:

Incumbent mayor Radosav Švabić of the Radical Party was confirmed for another term in office after the election. He was arrested in June 2009, and the local assembly was dissolved in November of the same year. Vlada Gajić of the Democratic Party led a provisional administration prior to a new local election in 2010.

Batočina
Results of the election for the Municipal Assembly of Batočina:

Incumbent mayor Radiša Milošević of the Democratic Party was confirmed for another term in office after the election.

Knić
Results of the election for the Municipal Assembly of Knić:

Borislav Burarac of the Democratic Party was chosen as mayor after the election.

Lapovo
Results of the election for the Municipal Assembly of Lapovo:

Incumbent mayor Dragan Zlatković of the Serbian Renewal Movement was confirmed for another term in office after the election.

Rača
Results of the election for the Municipal Assembly of Rača:

Dragana Živanović of New Serbia was chosen as mayor after the election.

Topola
Results of the election for the Municipal Assembly of Topola:

Incumbent mayor Dragan Jovanović of New Serbia was confirmed for another term in office after the election.

Zlatibor District
Elections were held in the one city (Užice) and all nine municipalities of the Zlatibor District.

Coalitions including the Democratic Party (DS) came to power in Užice, Arilje, Bajina Bašta (where a member of the Socialist Party of Serbia became mayor), and Nova Varoš. The Serbian Radical Party initially formed government in Požega, but a new administration led by the DS came to power in 2009.

Incumbent mayor Milan Stamatović led the Democratic Party of Serbia (DSS) to a majority victory in Čajetina. A coalition led by the DSS also came to power in Kosjerić, though it proved unstable; a new election was held in the municipality in 2009, and a coalition around the DS came to power there as well.

The Radical Party formed government in Priboj. After a party split later in the year, the local Radical Party leadership, including the mayor, joined the breakaway Serbian Progressive Party.

Prijepolje did not constitute a government within the required time, and a new election was held in December 2008. A coalition of the Sandžak Democratic Party, the Serbian Progressive Party, and the DS and its allies came to power; a member of the Progressives was chosen as mayor.

The Party of Democratic Action of Sandžak initially formed government in the predominantly Bosniak community of Sjenica. Later in the year, a new coalition led by the Sandžak Democratic Party came to power.

Užice
Results of the election for the City Assembly of Užice:

Jovan Marković of the Democratic Party was chosen as mayor after the election.

Arilje
Results of the election for the Municipal Assembly of Arilje:

Mirjana Avakumović of the Democratic Party was chosen as mayor after the election.

Bajina Bašta
Results of the election for the Municipal Assembly of Bajina Bašta:

The Democratic Party and the Socialist Party of Serbia emerged as the leading parties in Bajina Bašta's coalition government after the election, and incumbent mayor Miloje Savić of the Socialists was chosen for a new term in office. The Serbian Radical Party and the Democratic Party of Serbia formed a new government in April 2011 after the defection of two G17 Plus delegates, and Zlatan Jovanović became mayor.

Čajetina
Results of the election for the Municipal Assembly of Čajetina:

Incumbent mayor Milan Stamatović of the Democratic Party of Serbia was confirmed for another term in office after the election.

Future parliamentarian Bojana Božanić appeared in the seventh position on the Democratic Party of Serbia's list. She does not appear to have taken a mandate but instead served as an assistant to Stamatović.

Kosjerić
Results of the election for the Municipal Assembly of Kosjerić:

Incumbent mayor Željko Prodanović of the Democratic Party of Serbia was confirmed for another term in office after the election. Prodanović was removed from office on 26 February 2009, and a provisional administration was established with Milan Štulović of the Democratic Party as its leader. A new election was held in June 2009.

Nova Varoš
Results of the election for the Municipal Assembly of Nova Varoš:

Slaviša Purić of the Democratic Party was chosen as mayor after the elections, leading a coalition government that also included the Socialist Party of Serbia and G17 Plus.

Požega
Results of the election for the Municipal Assembly of Požega:

Aleksandar Grbović of the Serbian Radical Party was chosen as mayor after the election. A new governing coalition came to power in May 2009, and Milovan Mićović of the Democratic Party succeeded Grbović as mayor.

Priboj
Results of the election for the Municipal Assembly of Priboj:

Lazar Rvović of the Serbian Radical Party was chosen as mayor after the election. When the Radical Party split later in the year, Rvović and the entire Radical Party board in Priboj joined the breakaway Serbian Progressive Party. Rvović continued serving as mayor for the remainder of the term.

Prijepolje
Results of the election for the Municipal Assembly of Prijepolje:

The municipality of Prijepolje did not constitute a government within the legal deadline, and a new election was held on 10 November 2008. Dobra Lazarević of the Democratic Party was named as the leader of a provisional administration in August 2008.

The results of the repeat election were as follows:

The Sandžak Democratic Party, the Forward Serbia group (which later became the Serbian Progressive Party), and the coalition around the Democratic Party formed government after the election. Dragoljub Zindović of the Progressives was chosen as mayor. He formally took office in February 2009.

Sjenica
Results of the election for the Municipal Assembly of Sjenica:

Nusret Nuhović of the Party of Democratic Action of Sandžak (the main party in the Bosniak List for a European Sandžak) was chosen as mayor after the election. A new governing coalition came to power in December 2008, and Muriz Turković of the Sandžak Democratic Party succeeded Nuhović as mayor.

References 

Local elections in Serbia
Local
2008 in Serbia
May 2008 events in Europe